Placochelys ('flat-plate turtle") is an extinct genus  of placodont reptiles erected by Otto Jaekel in 1902.

Fossil records
Fossils of Placochelys dates back to the Triassic period (age range: 221.5 to 205.6 million years ago). They have been found in Germany, Austria, Hungary and Italy.

Species
This genus includes only one species:

 Placochelys placodonta Jaekel, 1902 (from Upper Ladinian of Hungary)

Description
It had a flat turtle-like carapace covered with knobbly plates, and a compact triangular skull. Its beaked skull had powerful muscles. It had only two pairs of palatal teeth, a large posterior pair, and a small rostral pair. The specialized broad teeth on the palate, were most likely used for crushing shellfish and hard-shelled prey. Its limbs were paddle-shaped for swimming, although, unlike modern sea turtles, they still had discernable toes, and it also had a short tail.

Gallery

Bibliography
 Jaekel O. 1902. Über Placochelys n. g. und ihre Beeutung fur die Stammesgeschichte der Schildkroten: Neues Jahrbuch fur Mineralogie, Geologie und Palaontologie, Abhandlungen, 1902: 127–144.
 Mazin, J.-M. and Pinna, G. 1993. Palaeoecology of the armoured placodonts. Paleontologia Lombarda, N. S. 2: 83–91.
 Rieppel O. and Zanon R.T. 1997. The interrelationships of Placodontia. Historical Biology: Vol. 12, pp. 211–227
 Yin G., in Yin, G., Zhou, X., Cao, Z., Yu, Y, and Luo, Y., 2000, A preliminary study on the Early Late Triassic marine reptiles from Guanling Guizhou, China.
 Rieppel O. 2001. The Cranial Anatomy of Placochelys placodonta Jaekel, 1902, And a Review of the Cyamodontoidea (reptilia, Placodonta) Fieldiana: Geology, New Series, No. 45:1-101.
 Rieppel, O., 2002, The dermal armor of the cyamodontoid placodonts (Reptilia, Sauropterygia): morphology and systematic value: Fieldiana; Geology, new series, n. 46, p. 1-41pp.

References

External links
 The cranial anatomy of Placochelys placodonta Jaekel, 1902, and a review of the Cyamodontoidea (Reptilia, Placodonta) (2001)
 PLACODONTS: THE BIZARRE ‘WALRUS-TURTLES’ OF THE TRIASSIC

Placodonts
Middle Triassic reptiles of Europe
Late Triassic reptiles of Europe
Sauropterygian genera